Princess William may refer to: 
Maria, Duchess of Gloucester and Edinburgh (1736–1807), wife of Prince William Henry, Duke of Gloucester and Edinburgh
Princess Mary, Duchess of Gloucester and Edinburgh (1776–1857), wife of Prince William Frederick, Duke of Gloucester and Edinburgh
Adelaide of Saxe-Meiningen (1792–1849), wife of Prince William, Duke of Clarence and St Andrews, who became William IV of the United Kingdom
Catherine, Princess of Wales (born 1982), wife of William, Prince of Wales, the heir apparent to the British throne